Dzhenko Sabev (2 June 1947 – 30 April 2020) was a Bulgarian equestrian. He competed in two events at the 1980 Summer Olympics.

References

External links
 

1947 births
2020 deaths
Bulgarian male equestrians
Olympic equestrians of Bulgaria
Equestrians at the 1980 Summer Olympics
Place of birth missing
20th-century Bulgarian people